Chitipa Airport  is an airport serving the town of Chitipa, Republic of Malawi.

See also
Transport in Malawi

References
Directory of Airports in Malawi
 Google Earth

External links

Airports in Malawi
Buildings and structures in Northern Region, Malawi